A constitutional referendum was held in Iceland between 20 and 23 May 1944. The 1 December 1918 Danish–Icelandic Act of Union declared Iceland to be a sovereign state separate from Denmark, but maintained the two countries in a personal union, with the King of Denmark also being the King of Iceland. In the two-part referendum, voters were asked whether the Union with Denmark should be abolished, and whether to adopt a new republican constitution. Both measures were approved, each with more than 98% in favour. Voter turnout was 98.4% overall, and 100% in two constituencies, Seyðisfirði and Vestur-Skaftafjellssýsla.

Results

Aftermath

The union with Denmark was dissolved on 17 June 1944. Since Denmark was still occupied by Nazi Germany, many Danes felt offended that the step was taken at that time. Nevertheless, King Christian X of Denmark sent a message of congratulations to Icelanders.

The Republican celebration was held in Þingvellir on 17 June 1944. At 13:30, Prime Minister Björn Þórðarson set the celebrations going, after which a religious ceremony was held. The Icelandic flag was raised and the members of the parliament rose from their seats as church bells rang. All declared unilaterally that Iceland would henceforth be a republic. The members of parliament then chose Sveinn Björnsson as the first president. Sveinn had been regent of Iceland and the King's placeholder during the war years. He was the only president not elected directly by the people of Iceland.

See also
Iceland during World War II

References

Referendums in Iceland
Constitutional referendum
Iceland
Denmark–Iceland relations
Constitution of Iceland
1944
Iceland
Iceland